Glyphodes rhombalis is a moth in the family Crambidae. It was described by Viette in 1957. It is found in São Tomé & Principe.

References

Moths described in 1957
Glyphodes